Kordia periserrulae is a Gram-negative, chemoheterotrophic and facultatively anaerobic bacterium from the genus of Kordia which has been isolated from the worm Periserrula leucophryna from the Yellow Sea in Korea.

References

Flavobacteria
Bacteria described in 2011